The Paakantyi language, also spelt Paakantji,  Barkindji, Barkandji, and Baagandji, and also known as the Darling language, is a nearly extinct Australian Aboriginal language spoken along the Darling River in New South Wales from present-day Bourke to Wentworth and including much of the back country around the Paroo River and Broken Hill. The people's and language name refers to the Paaka (Darling River) with the suffix -ntyi meaning "belonging to". The speakers of the language are known as the Paakantyi (or variant spelling).

The major work on the Paakantyi language has been that of linguist Luise Hercus.

Dialects 

Dialects of Paakantyi include Southern Paakantyi (Baagandji, Bagundji), Kurnu (Kula), Wilyakali (Wiljagali), and Pantyikali-Wanyiwalku (Wanyuparlku, Bandjigali, Baarundji), Parrintyi (Barrindji), Marawara (Maraura). Bowern (2011) lists Gurnu/Guula as a separate language, though Hercus includes it because of its almost identical vocabulary. Dixon adds several other names, some perhaps synonyms; Bulaali (Bulali) may have been an alternative name for Wilyakali, but also for a different language, Maljangapa. 

However; Tindale (1940) mapped the 'Rite of Circumcision' border around Wanyiwalku separating it from the rest of Paakantyi - Tindale instead groups Wanyiwalku together with Maljangapa, Wadikali & Karenggapa of the Yarli language.

Current status
A 2012 report indicated that two people could speak the Darling language fluently, while in the 2021 census, 111 individuals indicated that Paakantyi was spoken at home.

Phonology

Consonants 

Voiceless stops can also be heard as voiced [b, d̪, d, ɟ, ɖ, ɡ].

Vowels

References

External links 
 Bibliography of Paakantyi language and people resources, at the Australian Institute of Aboriginal and Torres Strait Islander Studies
 Paakantyi language, alphabet and pronunciation
 25 Paakantyi words every muurpa should know

Pama–Nyungan languages
Endangered indigenous Australian languages in New South Wales
Critically endangered languages